The Rahway Valles are a set of channels in a valley in the Elysium quadrangle of Mars, located at 9.4° North and 186.2° West. The region was created by 'a'ā and pāhoehoe lava flows from the nearby Elysium volcanic province.

References

Elysium quadrangle
valleys and canyons on Mars